Karnków may refer to the following places in Poland:
Karnków, Lower Silesian Voivodeship (south-west Poland)
Karnków, Łowicz County in Łódź Voivodeship (central Poland)
Karnków, Zgierz County in Łódź Voivodeship (central Poland)